Uranie was a 44-gun frigate of the French Navy, lead ship of her two-vessel class.

Career
She served in the Mediterranean, first under captain Maistral, and later under Margollé, operating from Ancona.

On 6 July 1803,  sailed from Malta carrying some supernumeraries for Admiral Nelson's fleet and escorting the transport Caroline, Dandison, master, which was carrying water. On the evening of 3 August  Redbridge encountered the frigate . Next morning Phoebe and Redbridge sighted four sail. Phoebe advised that they were probably French and the British ships set sail to escape. Phoebe was able to outpace their pursuers, but Redbridge was not and fell prey to them.

The four sail were a squadron of French frigates, Cornélie, Rhin, Uranie, and Tamise, and possibly some corvettes that had sortied in the night from Toulon. The French also captured the transport. Redbridges actual captor was Cornélie. Admiral Nelson attempted to send into Toulon a boat under a flag of truce offering the French a prisoner exchange, but the French refused his letter and proposal.

On 29 September 1810, the newly arrived French frigates Favorite, under Bernard Dubourdieu, and Uranie joined the Venetian squadron of Corona, Bellona, and Carolina. The force then sailed from Chiozzo to Ancona, arriving on 6 October, having sighted Hoste's Amphion in the distance during the passage.

On 27 November 1811,  chased the French frigates Uranie and Corcyre (armed en flute), and corvette Scemplone near Fano. Uranie and Scemplone escaped but Eagle was able to overhaul and capture Corceyre.

Fate
Uranie escaped from Ancona on 16 January 1814. She encountered  and to avoid her took refuge in Brindisi.  and  then arrived at Brindisi and anchored outside the port. Captain John Taylor, of Apollo then sent a message to the authorities at Brindisi that he understood that the Neapolitan Government had joined the Allies and declared war on the French, and why a French vessel was sheltering there. When Apollo appeared on the scene and made signs of being about to enter the port, Uranies captain removed the powder from his ship and set her on fire.

Notes, citations, and references
Notes

Citations

References
Nicolas, Nicholas Harris and Horatio Nelson (1845) The Dispatches and Letters of Vice Admiral Lord Viscount Nelson, with Notes, Volume 5. (Colburn).
 

  
 

Uranie-class frigates
Age of Sail frigates of France
1800 ships